Jerry Joseph (born April 19, 1961) is an American singer, songwriter, and guitarist.

Early life
Jerry Joseph was born on April 19, 1961 in Los Angeles, California and is of Irish, Lebanese and Syrian ancestry and grew up in the San Diego area.  In high school, he began experiencing trouble and was sent by his parents to a boarding school in New Zealand, where he started playing guitar professionally at age 15.  He experienced further problems with juvenile delinquency while there and was eventually deported back to the United States.  He wound up in Arcata, California, where he has familial ties stretching back several generations.

Little Women
While in Arcata, Joseph formed the rock/reggae band Little Women in late 1981.  The band consisted of Brad Rosen on drums, Stefan Derby on bass, Eric Hellberg on keyboards and Jerry Joseph on guitar. Several guitarists (lead), including Greg Millar (1983), Steve Smith (1989), Steve Kimock (1989) and Steven James Wright (1987), replacing Darby on bass was C. Louis Butts, Jr (1983-1992) and percussionists, Ernesto Pediango (1983), Tony (1983) eventually filled the slot.

Little Women's first self-released cassette (recorded 1986-7@SaltLakeCity,UT) was Life's Just Bitchin in 1987 and featured Jerry Joseph (1981-?, vocals, guitar), C. Louis Butts Jr. (3/13/1983-8/7/1992, bass, vocals), Geoff George (1982-1992, keyboards, vocals), Gregg Freeman (1985-1989, percussion), and Brad Rosen (1981-1993, drums, vocals).

That was followed in 1990 with Pretty Wiped Out which was the first release to feature the staple Chainsaw City and had Rosen on drums and Butts on bass, James on guitar, and also featured David Lindley, Ian McLagan and Steve Kimock.

Little Women released a single for the Wahine Records label in 1992 of Drive b/w Milk as well as the live album, Live Radish Head(Butts on bass).  In 1993 the band released Live at New Georges which was recorded in 1992 (Butts on bass), and contained North, the Jimmy Webb classic Wichita Lineman. The live band line-up (late-1992 onward) consisted of Joseph, Steve James, Greg Williams/Danny Carbo (drums) and Glen Esparza (bass).

In 2006, Joseph's Cosmo Sex School records rereleased Live Radish Head, another 1992 live set (Butts on bass, vocals).

They eventually signed to Capricorn Records but were ultimately dropped after recording what would become The Welcome Hunters in 1993.

Solo career and the Jackmormons
After the breakup of Little women in 1993, Joseph released The Welcome Hunters which was basically a Little Women record with James, Esparza and Gregg Williams on drums.  This was the first album to contain the hit Climb To Safety which is often covered by the band Widespread Panic.

1994 brought the next Joseph solo record, Love and Happiness on Back Door Records which featured an all-new lineup of musicians, including Dave Schools on bass. The record was recorded in Muscle Shoals, Alabama.

In 1996, Joseph moved to Utah and formed the band Jackmormons with bassist JR Ruppel, drummer Jim Bone and keyboard player Dave Pellicciaro. Their first album was Butte, Mont. 1879 in 1996, followed by Cotton in 1997. After a few personnel changes the band released Goodlandia  and Salt Lake City and then the three-piece lineup of Joseph, Rosen and Ruppel was in place. This lineup would remain for the Jackmormons for more than a decade, including on 2001's Conscious Contact which also included Chuck Leavell (organ, piano), Randall Bramblett (organ, wurlitzer), Michael Houser (guitar), Vic Chesnutt (backing vocals), John Keane (pedal steel), John Neff (pedal steel), Todd Nance (percussion) and  David Barbe (sirens), and 2003's Mouthful of Copper.  In 2005, the Jackmormons released Into the Lovely which was the first record to feature Steve Drizos on drums, and included backing vocals from his wife Jenny Conlee of The Decemberists.

In parallel to the Jackmormons' career, Joseph released the solo record Everything Was Beautiful for Ulftone Records in 2000 which featured Ruppel, Rosen, Pete Droge, Ian Moore, Layng Martine III and others. Joseph's first release for Cosmo Sex School Records, a label he founded in 2003, was a duet with Danny Dzuik (credited as Dzuiks Küche), called Oil, which also featured David Lindley on the track Any Other Day. In 2004 Cherry was released on Terminus Records. 2006 brought April Nineteenth, recorded at Mississippi studios in Portland and featuring Joseph, Drizos and the return of Steve James. In 2010, the group released Badlandia, recorded in Virginia city, Montana and also featuring Conlee.

The first vinyl release on Cosmo Sex School was a 2012 Jackmormons 7" of Mile High, Mile Deep b/w a cover of Michael Houser's Airplane. In 2012 the Jackmormons released Happy Book, a 2-CD set featuring guest appearances by Conlee, her Decemberists bandmate Chris Funk, Eric Earley (Blitzen Trapper), Dan Eccles (Richmond Fontaine), Ingram, Little Sue Weaver and Paul Brainard.

In 2008, Joseph and Drizos recorded a self-titled album under the moniker The Denmark Veseys. The album, recorded in Athens, GA and released on Cosmo Sex School, features appearances from Barbe, Neff and the Chase Park Transduction Choir.  Soon after the pair entered the studio with multi-instrumentalist Bret Mosley to record the Charge EP at  Old Soul Studio in Catskill, NY. the album was recorded live-to-tape and was the first album Joseph offered exclusively as an online download of digital tracks.

Joseph and his Stockholm Syndrome bandmate Wally Ingram teamed up for 2010's Civility EP which includes covers of M.I.A.'s Paper Planes and Blitzen Trapper's Furr.

Joseph released Jerry Joseph on October 31, 2013, an album of 11 original songs, many of which are older Jackmormons, Little Women and Stockholm Syndrome songs reworked to fit his current solo acoustic aesthetic.

Stockholm Syndrome
Joseph began to use the Stockholm Syndrome moniker for a tour of Europe with Dave Schools in 2003.

The band later morphed into a 5-piece with Widespread Panic bassist Dave Schools, guitarist Eric McFadden, and Ingram. They recorded Holy Happy Hour at the famed Compass Point Studios with producer Terry Manning. The album featured mostly new compositions, along with a cover of the Climax Blues Band's Couldn't Get It Right.

Stockholm Syndrome toured in 2004 to support the album, while Schools' primary gig was on hiatus.  Stockholm Syndrome reformed in 2010 with Gov't Mule keyboardist Danny Louis replacing Dzuik, and recorded Live at Streetlight Records during a tour stop in California, and also Apollo in 2011.

Songwriting
Joseph is noted for his songwriting and the depth of his "creative, cathartic" lyrics. Widespread Panic has covered seven of Joseph's songs on record, and several others live.

"Climb to Safety" has appeared on the 'Til the Medicine Takes, Live in the Classic City, Colorado Springs 1998, Wood and Choice Cuts: The Capricorn Years 1991-1999 albums.

His song "North" (co-written with Woody Harrelson) was featured in the movie The Earth Will Swallow You and later on the studio album Dirty Side Down and archival release Wilmington, DE 2001.

He later co-wrote "Second Skin" and  "Time Zones" for Earth to America  and three compositions for the Free Somehow album, "Boom Boom Boom", "Flicker", and "Dark Day Program".

He also co-authored "Yellow Ribbons" for Bloodkin with lead singer Daniel Hutchens.

Discography

References

1961 births
American expatriates in New Zealand
American people of Irish descent
American people of Lebanese descent
American people of Syrian descent
American male singer-songwriters
Living people
People from Arcata, California
People from San Diego County, California
Singer-songwriters from California
Stockholm Syndrome (band) members